Saba Faisal (Punjabi) is a Pakistani actress and former news anchor. In her career  more than a decade, she has appeared in several acclaimed television serials, theatre, plays and films mainly in Urdu language.

Film

Television

Awards and nominations
Nominated for Best Actress for Pal Bhar Mein at 11th Lux Style Awards.

References

External links

Living people
Punjabi people
Pakistani film actresses
20th-century Pakistani actresses
21st-century Pakistani actresses
Pakistani television actresses
PTV Award winners
Year of birth missing (living people)